Eduardo Laurencena (1885–1959) was an Argentine politician. He served as governor of Entre Ríos Province and was a Senator. His father, Miguel Laurencena, was a governor of the same province.

References

Radical Civic Union politicians
1885 births
1959 deaths
Governors of Entre Ríos Province
Members of the Argentine Senate for Entre Ríos
Presidents of the Central Bank of Argentina